Bryan's Store is a historic saloon and general store located at Loudonville in Albany County, New York.

Description and history 
It was built originally as a saloon and moved to its present location in 1862, after which it was converted for use as a store and post office. It is a two-story, frame building with a slate roof on a brick foundation.

It was listed on the National Register of Historic Places on October 4, 1979.

References

Commercial buildings on the National Register of Historic Places in New York (state)
Commercial buildings completed in 1862
Buildings and structures in Albany County, New York
1862 establishments in New York (state)
National Register of Historic Places in Albany County, New York